The 2020 Democratic National Convention was a presidential nominating convention that was held from August 17 to 20, 2020, at the Wisconsin Center in Milwaukee, Wisconsin, and virtually across the United States. At the convention, delegates of the United States Democratic Party formally chose former vice president Joe Biden and Senator Kamala Harris of California as the party's nominees for president and vice president, respectively, in the 2020 United States presidential election.

Originally scheduled to be held July 13–16, 2020, at the Fiserv Forum in Milwaukee just a week before the Tokyo Summer Olympics, the convention was postponed to August 17–20, 2020, due to the ongoing COVID-19 pandemic in the United States. The convention was ultimately downsized, with its location shifted to the city's Wisconsin Center and most of the convention presenting remotely from sites across the United States.

Due to the COVID-19 pandemic, the format was substantially different from previous conventions, with the duration of each day of the convention being significantly shorter than in past conventions, and with most of the convention being held remotely from many venues across the country. While being a largely virtual convention, it was officially centered at the Wisconsin Center, which is where its production was headquartered, where its roll call was directed from, and where a limited number of speeches (primarily those by Wisconsin politicians) were staged. Both Biden and Harris made their respective speeches remotely from the Chase Center on the Riverfront in Wilmington, Delaware. Joe Biden and Kamala Harris went on to win the 2020 election, defeating the Republican party ticket of incumbent President Donald Trump, and Vice President Mike Pence.

Background

The convention was the 49th Democratic National Convention.

Site selection 

Bids on the site for the convention were solicited for the convention by the Democratic National Committee (DNC) in late 2017. Preliminary requirements for host cities that the DNC laid out included that they should have between 17,000 and 18,000 hotel rooms (including 1,000 luxury suites) located within 30 minutes of the convention venue.

The Democratic National Committee made the bids public in the spring of 2018. Las Vegas withdrew and decided to focus on the 2020 Republican National Convention, for which its bid was subsequently defeated by Charlotte. In April 2018, the Democratic National Committee sent requests for proposals to the eight remaining cities that had expressed interest in hosting the event (Atlanta, Birmingham, Denver, Houston, Miami, Milwaukee, New York City, and San Francisco).

On June 20, 2018, the Democratic National Committee announced four finalists for the convention site (Denver, Houston, Miami, and Milwaukee). Immediately following the announcement, the finalist city of Denver withdrew from consideration due to apparent scheduling conflicts.

Chairman of the Democratic National Committee Tom Perez announced on March 11, 2019, that Milwaukee would host the convention.

The selection of Milwaukee made this the first Democratic National Convention to be hosted in the Midwestern United States since Chicago hosted the 1996 Democratic National Convention, and the first to be hosted in a midwestern city other than Chicago since St. Louis hosted the 1916 Democratic National Convention. This was the first major party convention held in Milwaukee. It was also the first major party convention to be held in any city in the state of Wisconsin.

Milwaukee is smaller than other metropolitan areas that had hosted recent major party conventions. Milwaukee is among the smallest metropolitan areas to have hosted a major party convention. Milwaukee's success in bidding for the convention was viewed in some circles as an upset, as the other two remaining finalist cities were not only larger metropolitan areas, but also had significant experience hosting major events such as Super Bowls.

Milwaukee's selection was seen, in part, as emphasizing party's desire to place an focus on winning Midwestern states like Wisconsin, and its desire to win back "blue wall" states in the upper Midwest and Great Lakes region. The swing states of Michigan, Pennsylvania, and Wisconsin had been the states which the Republican ticket of Donald Trump and Mike Pence had won by the narrowest margins in the preceding 2016 election, and had these states been instead won by the 2016 Democratic ticket of Hillary Clinton and Tim Kaine, they would have delivered the Democratic ticket an electoral college victory in 2016. The 2016 election had also been the first time since the 1980s that any of these three states had voted Republican. The three aforementioned "blue wall" states were, ultimately, won by the Biden-Harris ticket in 2020.

Some sources cited DNC chairman Tom Perez's personal connections to Milwaukee as a factor that aided Milwaukee's selection. His wife had originally been from nearby Wauwatosa, they had held their wedding in Milwaukee, and their daughter was a current student at University of Wisconsin–Milwaukee.

Bids
Several cities made efforts to be selected as the location of the 2020 convention.

Change of venue 
On June 24, 2020, it was announced that the convention had been downsized and would be held at Milwaukee's Wisconsin Center instead of its originally planned venue, Milwaukee's Fiserv Forum. The change of location made this the first major party convention held in a convention center since the 1996 Republican National Convention, and the first Democratic convention to be held in such a venue since the 1984 Democratic National Convention.

Role of superdelegates

Superdelegates are delegates to the convention who are automatically chosen by the party, rather than by the results of primaries and caucuses. While technically unpledged, in the past many of them have informally pledged themselves to a predesignated front-runner in previous elections. The superdelegate system is controversial among Democrats, and supporters of both Clinton and Sanders have called for their removal in 2020.

The Unity Reform Commission, created after the 2016 election, recommended that the number of 2020 superdelegates be drastically reduced. In July 2018, the DNC revoked the voting rights for superdelegates on the first ballot, unless a candidate has secured a majority using only pledged delegates.

Except for the presidential nomination, superdelegates will vote on all issues.

Selection of pledged delegates

The number of delegates allocated to each of the 50 states and Washington, D.C., are based on, among others, the proportion of votes each state gave to the Democratic candidate in the 2008, 2012, and 2016 presidential elections. A fixed number of pledged delegates are allocated to each of the five U.S. territories and Democrats Abroad.

Qualification of suspended campaigns
The Democratic National Committee's 2020 selection rules state that any candidate who is no longer running loses the statewide delegates they have won and those delegates are then reallocated to candidates still in the race. However, the interpretation of this rule in 2020 races might be different than the interpretation in past races. In previous elections, such as the 2008 presidential primary, candidates would suspend their candidacies rather than formally withdraw, allowing their already pledged delegates to attend the convention and pick up new ones along the way.

Logistics
Before it was downsized, 50,000 people had been expected to attend the convention. 31 state delegations were to stay in 2,926 Milwaukee-area hotel rooms and 26 delegations were to stay in 2,841 hotel rooms in Lake County and Rosemont, Illinois. Another 11,000 hotel rooms were to house volunteers, members of the media, donors, and other attendees.

Milwaukee had been planning an extension of its streetcar line to be completed in advance of the convention. However, these plans faltered, and the expansion was not completed in time for the convention.

Organizers were originally planning to recruit 15,000 volunteers.

The firm Populous was named as the event architect. Populous was assigned to work in partnership with Milwaukee firm American Design Inc. In February 2020, Milwaukee-based JCP construction was awarded the contract to be the construction general contractor for the convention. Hargrove LLC was, at the same time, awarded the contract to serve as the convention's event management firm.

Host committee

The Milwaukee 2020 Host Committee was established to organize the convention.

In October 2019, the Host Committee announced its leadership team. The president of the Host Committee was Liz Gilbert. Leadership included a board of directors. Further leadership included co-chairs and vice chairs, as well as honorary vice-chairs. The co-chairs of the Host Committee were Milwaukee mayor Tom Barrett and Congresswoman Gwen Moore. Vice chairs included Milwaukee County executive Chris Abele, U.S. senator Tammy Baldwin, Lieutenant Governor of Wisconsin Mandela Barnes, Governor of Wisconsin Tony Evers, former U.S. senator Herb Kohl. Honorary vice chairs included Milwaukee Common Council president Ashanti Hamilton and Wisconsin state treasurer Sarah Godlewski, Democratic leader for the Wisconsin State Assembly Gordon Hintz, Attorney General of Wisconsin Josh Kaul, Congressman Ron Kind, Wisconsin secretary of state Doug La Follette, Congressman Mark Pocan, and Wisconsin State Senate minority leader Jennifer Shilling. Additionally, the Host Committee's honorary finance chair was Alex Lasry, the senior vice president of the Milwaukee Bucks.

In early February 2020, Milwaukee 2020 Host Committee president Liz Gilbert and her chief-of-staff Adam Lonso were both fired after an investigation found that the committee's "work environment did not meet the ideals and expectations" of the organization's board (with allegations of a "toxic" work environment). Acting as interim leader of the Host Committee was Teresa Vilmain. In late February, new leadership team was announced with Raquel Filmanowicz serving as CEO and Paula Penebaker serving as COO, with both taking these positions formally on March 2, 2020.

The host committee raised $40 million to stage the convention.

Delay
The convention was originally scheduled to be held July 13–16, 2020,

On April 2, 2020, it was announced that, due to the COVID-19 pandemic, the convention would be delayed to August 17–20.

Downsizing
As early as April 2020, the Democratic Party had been bracing for the possibility of a virtual convention. On May 12, 2020, the Democratic National Committee authorized the convention planners to research alternative methods for participants to cast votes, considering the possibility that the Democratic National Committee may decide to hold the entire convention virtually.

On June 24, 2020, it was announced that the convention was to be downsized. The venue was shifted from the Fiserv Forum to the Wisconsin Center. But, instead of the entire convention being held in Milwaukee, it would now feature Milwaukee as merely a hub city for the major convention events. The convention was now planned to instead consist of what the DNC said would be "curated content from Milwaukee and other satellite cities, locations, and landmarks across the country". All official business will now be conducted remotely. Organizers canceled official parties and events scheduled to be held in Milwaukee before and coinciding with the convention. Delegates were asked to no longer travel to Milwaukee, and plans were now formally made to implement a system for them to cast their votes virtually.

In mid-July, members of Congress were told not to travel to attend the event in Milwaukee.

At the announcement of the downsizing it was declared that Biden would accept his nomination in Milwaukee. It was later announced on July 30, 2020, that his running mate would also accept her nomination in Milwaukee. However, on August 5, 2020, it was announced that Biden no longer planned to travel to Milwaukee to accept his nomination, and would instead do so from Delaware. It was also announced then that the other scheduled speakers, including Biden's running mate, will also be addressing the convention remotely. This is seen as, effectively, moving to make the convention almost entirely virtual. This was the first time that a major party presidential candidate has accepted their nomination remotely since Franklin D. Roosevelt did so in 1944.

There were initially plans to have up to 5,000 attendees in Milwaukee. It was later further reduced to 1,000, and then 300 people, including both attendees and media granted access. Due to an order by the Milwaukee Health Department barring gatherings over 250 people, the total number of people permitted to gather at the Milwaukee convention hub was capped at that number. There were no delegates in the Wisconsin Center. While speakers were not traveling to Milwaukee, it was still planned for Chairman of the Democratic National Committee Tom Perez and Secretary of the Democratic National Committee Jason Rae (also secretary of the convention) to be in Milwaukee.

The owner of the Milwaukee Bucks and the Fiserv Forum threatened to sue the Democratic Party, which had paid only $5.5 million of the $7 million rent on the abandoned venue.

Health protocols
Due to the ongoing COVID-19 pandemic, a number of protocols have been put in place.

Participants at Wisconsin Center were required to self-quarantine for at least 72 hours before arriving, wear personal protective equipment, undergo daily COVID-19 testing, partake in symptom tracking through a daily questionnaire, avoid bars and restaurants, and follow Centers for Disease Control and Prevention guidelines.

Security
As is routine for a major party convention, the event had been designated a National Special Security Event. Originally, the United States Department of Justice was to provide $50 million in security, but this was decreased to $40 million.

The boundaries of the planned security footprint, in which increased security measures would be implemented, but in which individuals not attending the convention (including demonstrators) were still to be permitted, was announced in January 2020. The streets marking the boundary of the announced footprint were to be Cherry Street on the north, 10th Street on the west, Clybourn Street, and Water Street on the east. On July 24, 2020, the Milwaukee Common Council passed an ordinance that would ban a long list of items from the security footprint, including air rifles, nunchucks, drones, containers of bodily fluids, glass bottles, and coolers. On August 12, 2020, it was announced that the security footprint had been shrunk significantly. The security footprint ultimately encompassed almost only areas directly surrounding the convention center.

Fencing was erected surrounding the Wisconsin Center. Temporary flight restrictions were in place each night from 6:00 to 11:00 p.m. CDT. A ban on drones was also in place.

Originally, the city originally budgeted to have approximately 3,000 law enforcement officers from outside the city assist the Milwaukee Police Department during the convention. This was decreased to approximately 2,000. By late July there were anticipated to be only 1,100 officers from outside the city assisting the department. However, in late July, more than 100 police agencies announced that they would be withdrawing from their contracts to provide personnel to aid in security during the convention after the Milwaukee police chief announced that their department would restrict the use of tear gas and pepper spray by law enforcement during demonstrations and protests. The Wisconsin National Guard then planned to provide hundreds of members to help with security. There had been talk of potentially limiting boat traffic on the Milwaukee River by placing a temporary stay on all bridge openings, but this security measure did not materialize.

Programming

The official theme of the convention was "Uniting America". The Wisconsin Center was used for the convention's broadcast and production, acting as the control room and "hub" of the convention production. The convention's programming was a mix of pre-recorded segments and live broadcasts from sites across the United States. The convention organizers established a custom video control room in the exhibit hall on the third floor of the Wisconsin Center, designed to handle hundreds of feeds from across the country, in order to accommodate the remote speeches. Supplementary control rooms existed in other locations, such as in Delaware. Producer Glenn Weiss oversaw the production from a temporary control studio created for him at his personal residence.

Speakers appeared from various "satellite locations", including key studios in Los Angeles, New York City, and at the Chase Center on the Riverfront in Wilmington, Delaware. The broadcasts were hosted from Los Angeles. All of the speeches were held behind closed doors with no audience.

A stage was set up in a conference room on the second floor of the Wisconsin Center. The stage at the Wisconsin Center saw limited use, with a number of participants from Wisconsin using it as the venue for their participation in the convention. Convention secretary Jason Rae also directed the roll call from the Wisconsin Center stage. The roll call featured votes being presented from locations in each state or territory, with some of the votes presented by special guests emphasizing Biden's history and platform; Bob Casey Jr. appeared from Biden's childhood home in Scranton, Pennsylvania, LGBT rights activists Judy and Dennis Shepard presented Wyoming's votes, and gun control advocate Fred Guttenberg (whose daughter was killed in the Stoneman Douglas High School shooting) presented Florida's votes.

The duration of the convention program was significantly downsized, from one that was originally expected to total 24 hours over the four days, to one that would total only eight hours. The downsizing led the convention organizers to need far fewer volunteers than the 15,000 they had originally been trying to recruit. Prior to the beginning of each night's programming, the hip-hop music channel Behind the Rhyme on Twitch streamed the official pre-show and post-show for each night, with the latter featuring performances by Beverly Bond, Vashtie, DJ Cassidy, Jermaine Dupri on each night respectively. Music performances were filmed for inclusion in the main programming. The political podcast Pod Save America also aired a "Live from the Democratic National Couch-vention" special prior to the August 20 broadcast, which featured the premiere of its new documentary short Dress Rehearsal, which chronicled the April 2020 state Supreme Court election in Wisconsin.

Platform
In April, shortly after Sanders endorsed Biden, the two created a "Unity task force" to draft a version of the party platform. The Democratic National Convention Committee set up a series of "virtual platform meetings" to garner input from the general public.

The Platform Drafting Committee Chair is Atlanta mayor Keisha Lance Bottoms. The Platform Standing Committee includes a number of party leaders and elected officials appointed by the DNC:

Drafting process
Public hearings were live-streamed on the DNCC's YouTube channel on the following topics:

 Monday, June 29 from 5-8 p.m. ET: "Addressing the COVID-19 Health Crisis and Building Back Better." A "Medicare for All" provision was rejected by the committee on June 27 on a 125–36 vote.
 Wednesday, July 1 from 5-8 p.m. ET: "A Vision for a More Equitable Future"
 Thursday, July 2 from 5-8 p.m. ET: "Restoring the Soul of America"

The full Platform Drafting Committee met on July 15 and 27, where they submitted a finished product to be voted on via the internet from August 1–15.

Platform provisions and ratification
After months of negotiations, Biden/Sanders platform task force issued its 110-page report on July 9 outlining platform recommendations. Convention delegates officially adopted the Democratic Party's 2020 platform on August 18, following delegate balloting by mail. The platform was divided into ten sections: "pandemic response, the economy, health care, criminal justice, climate, immigration, education, foreign policy, voting rights, and identity-related rights issues." The platform calls for:
 A universal public health insurance option for all Americans.
 Allowing Medicare to negotiate for lower prescription drug prices.
 Universal free COVID-19 testing, treatment, and vaccines.
 To combat climate change, eliminating carbon emissions (pollution) from power plants by 2035 and making substantial investments in U.S. infrastructure and renewable energy.
 Increasing housing supply, including affordable housing.
 Making community colleges tuition-free for all, and making public colleges and universities tuition-free for students from families with under $125,000 in annual income.
 An increase in the minimum wage to $15 an hour and an increase in the Child and Dependent Care tax credit.
 Comprehensive criminal justice reform.
 Repealing the Hyde Amendment.
 Decriminalizing the use of marijuana and allowing states to fully legalize marijuana.
 Statehood for the District of Columbia; self-determination for Puerto Rico, including the right of Puerto Ricans to decide whether to become a state; and restoration of Voting Rights Act provisions.
 Comprehensive immigration reform, including a pathway to citizenship for unauthorized immigrants.
 "Bring our forever wars to a responsible end" but maintain a small U.S. military presence in Iraq to "ensure the lasting defeat of ISIS"
 End the "race to war with Iran" and seek restoration of the Obama-era multilateral agreement with Iran.
 Support for a two-state solution to the Israeli–Palestinian conflict, coupled with an "ironclad" commitment to the security of Israel.

The platform was the most progressive in Democratic Party history, and the most progressive for any major political party in U.S. history. However, there was some dissent from the party's left wing over the omission of platform planks supporting single-payer healthcare ("Medicare for All") or the Green New Deal. Prior to the convention, over 700 delegates, largely from Bernie Sanders' camp, previously signed a statement vowing to vote against the platform because it did not include a provision supporting Medicare for All; this included U.S. representatives Rashida Tlaib and Ro Khanna. Although the platform was adopted, a final vote count was not released.

Convention leadership
On March 26, 2019, Joe Solmonese, former president of the Human Rights Campaign, was named convention CEO.

On June 1, 2020, the campaign of presumptive nominee Joe Biden named two advisers to the convention, naming Addisu Demissie as adviser for convention coordination and Lindsay Holst as senior adviser for convention and special projects.

Programming was overseen by Ricky Kirshner, who acted as producer. In addition, Stephanie Cutter held the formal position of Program Executive. Glenn Weiss acted as the director. Jessica Jennings was the director of media logistics.

Officers
On July 30, 2020, the officers of the convention were designated. Representative Bennie Thompson served as the permanent chair of the convention.

Permanent co-chairs were Milwaukee mayor Tom Barrett, Rep. Tony Cárdenas of California, Senator Tom Carper of Delaware, Senator Tammy Duckworth of Illinois, Mayor of Atlanta Keisha Lance Bottoms, and New Jersey governor Phil Murphy. The convention's vice-chairs were Senator Bob Casey Jr. of Pennsylvania, former representative Tony Coelho of California, Representative Sharice Davids of Kansas, Lieutenant Governor of Michigan Garlin Gilchrist, Congresswoman Donna Shalala of Florida, former Representative Carol Shea-Porter of New Hampshire, Lieutenant Governor of Wisconsin Mandela Barnes, and Lieutenant Governor of Nevada Kate Marshall. Speaker of the House Nancy Pelosi and Senate minority leader Chuck Schumer served as honorary chairs.

The convention's sergeant-at-arms was Representative Gwen Moore of Wisconsin. Jason Rae acted as secretary of the convention. The convention's parliamentarians were House majority leader Steny Hoyer, Helen McFadden, Sarah E. Merkle, and state senator Yvanna Cancela of Nevada.

Nominating and balloting

Pre-convention delegate count
The table below reflects the presumed delegate count as per the 2020 Democratic primaries.

, the following overall number of pledged delegates is subject to change, as possible penalty/bonus delegates (awarded for each state scheduled election date and potential regional clustering) may be altered.

The 2020 Democratic Party rules state that, unless a candidate has secured a majority of delegates using only pledged delegates, the superdelegates will have no voting rights on the first ballot.

Candidates who have suspended their campaigns without having received any pledged or superdelegate endorsements, as well as those who've suspended their campaigns and subsequently lost their endorsements to other candidates, are not included in the table below.

The table below reflects the presumed pledged delegate count following the 2020 Democratic primaries. In addition to these, there will also be 771 superdelegate votes (including the eight half-votes belonging to Democrats Abroad superdelegates), making for 4,750 combined delegate votes.

Presidential balloting

In an email, DNC secretary Jason Rae wrote to delegates outlining the process for that year's convention, noting that the planning committee "concluded that state delegations should not plan to travel to Milwaukee and official convention business will be conducted remotely."

Delegates vote remotely using a system the planning committee crafted that allows them to cast their ballots via email, with unique identifiers for security. The DNC had plans to certify each delegate.

The party said delegates would be able to fill out the forms electronically, with no need for a printer or physical copy, according to the letter. The ballot, which includes questions about platform planks and the party's nominees, will be emailed to their state's committee. Once a state party had all the ballots from their delegation, the state delegation's chair would "submit a tally sheet to the Secretary's Office that formally records the number of votes cast on each item of convention business," The votes would be counted all at once on August 15, not as they come in.

Voting began August 3 and ended August 15, when the state delegation chairs were asked to submit their final tallies to the DNC secretary. That meant that the party knew the tally of votes for its nominee before the convention formally began.

Presidential roll call vote
The traditional roll call of the states was held on the second night of the convention. It was done remotely from each of the 57 delegations, including all 50 states and seven additional territories/jurisdictions (the District of Columbia, the five inhabited U.S. territories, and Democrats Abroad). Organizers planned for it to last approximately 30 minutes. Convention secretary Jason Rae directed the roll call from the Wisconsin Center.

The remote roll call was widely praised.

Announcing their states' delegates' nominations were:

Vice presidential nomination
The Rules Committee report which was passed by the convention addressed, among other things, the fiascos that occurred during the 1972 and 1980 conventions as regards selection of the vice-presidential nominee.

Rule C.7. of the Rules of Procedure states:

In accordance with this provision, Biden submitted Harris's  name to the chairman, Bennie Thompson, and after Thompson's public reading of the rule, she was declared nominated.

Schedule
Each night of the convention was planned to last two hours. In addition to the convention's overall official theme of "Uniting America", each night had an official sub-theme of its own.

Monday, August 17 

9:00–11:00 p.m. EDT

Emcee: Eva Longoria

Theme "We the People"

Sub-themes
"We the People Demanding Racial Justice"
"We the People Helping Each Other Through COVID-19"
"We the People Putting Country Over Party"
"We the People Recovering"
"We the People Rise"

Evening schedule
Opening ceremonies
Introduction by actress Eva Longoria
Call to Order by convention chair Bennie Thompson
Pledge of Allegiance
Performance of the United States national anthem ("The Star-Spangled Banner")
Invocation by Gabriel Salguero
Main convention program
Benediction by Jerry Young
Nightly close of order by convention chair Bennie Thompson

Select speakers (in order of appearance)

Performances (in order of appearance)
Leon Bridges performing "Sweetness"
Maggie Rogers performing "Back In My Body"
Billy Porter and Stephen Stills performing "For What It's Worth"

Selected film segments
"The Path Forward": A Conversation with Vice President Biden on Racial Justice (featuring Joe Biden, Houston police chief Art Acevedo, activist Jamira Burley, activist Gwen Carr, NAACP president Derrick Johnson, and Chicago mayor Lori Lightfoot)
A Conversation with Healthcare Workers on the Front Lines (moderated by United States women's national soccer team member Megan Rapinoe)
"United We Stand" (featuring Kamala Harris and former 2020 Democratic presidential candidates United States senator Cory Booker, United States senator Kirsten Gillibrand, Governor of Washington Jay Inslee, United States senator Amy Klobuchar, United States representative Seth Moulton, former United States representative Beto O'Rourke, businessman Tom Steyer, and businessman Andrew Yang)

Tuesday, August 18 

The second night of the convention included official business, such as the nominating roll call for president.

9:00–11:00 p.m. EDT

Emcee: Tracee Ellis Ross

Theme "Leadership Matters"

Evening schedule
Call to order by Mayor of Milwaukee Tom Barrett
Credentials Committee Report
James H. Roosevelt
Lorraine Miller
Rules Committee Report
Barney Frank
Maria Cardona
Platform Committee Report
Julie Chavez Rodriguez
Denis McDonough
Keynote address
Main convention program (part 1)
Nominations and roll call
Main convention program (part 2)

Select speakers (in order of appearance)

Select film segments
The Biden Plan: Healthcare (narrated by Jeff Bridges)
A More Perfect Union: A Conversation on Healthcare (featuring Joe Biden, and health care activists Julie Buckholt, Steve Gomez, Jeff Jeans, Laura Packard, Angie Taylor)
The Biden Plan: National Security
An Unlikely Friendship (narrated in part by Cindy McCain, widow of the late Senator John McCain from Arizona)
Teacher

Performances
John Legend

Wednesday, August 19 

9:00–11:00 p.m. EDT

Emcee: Kerry Washington

Theme "A More Perfect Union"

Sub-themes
A More Perfect Society
A More Perfect Economy

Evening schedule
Prior to the evening program, the Democratic Governors Association hosted the panel "Bold Leadership: Women Governors Leading", which featured Oregon governor Kate Brown, Kansas governor Laura Kelly, New Mexico governor Michelle Lujan Grisham, Maine governor Janet Mills and Michigan governor Gretchen Whitmer, and was moderated by Rhode Island governor Gina Raimondo. 
Introduction
Call to Order by convention chair Bennie Thompson
Pledge of Allegiance
Main convention program
Vice-presidential nomination
Vice-presidential acceptance speech

Select speakers (in order of appearance)

Select film segments
America Rising: March for Our Lives (featuring X González)
The Biden Plan: Climate Change
A Conversation with Young Climate Activists
A Letter to Trump on Immigration
America Rising: Immigrants Rebuilding America
America Rising: From Women's Suffrage to the Women's March
When You See Something Wrong
America Recovering (featuring United States senator from Ohio Sherrod Brown, Mayor of Los Angeles Eric Garcetti, and United States congresswoman from Iowa Cindy Axne)

Performances
Billie Eilish performing "My Future"
Prince Royce performing "Stand by Me"
Jennifer Hudson performing "A Change Is Gonna Come"

Thursday, August 20 

9:00–11:00 p.m. EDT

Emcee: Julia Louis-Dreyfus

Theme "America's Promise"

Evening schedule
Call to Order by convention chair Bennie Thompson
Remarks by Andrew Yang
Introduction by Julia Louis Dreyfus
Pledge of Allegiance
National anthem ("The Star-Spangled Banner") performed by The Chicks
Invocation by Sister Simone Campbell
Main convention program
Presidential acceptance speech
Fireworks display
Benediction
Adjournment by convention chair Bennie Thompson

Select speakers (in order of appearance)

Select film segments
A Tribute to John Lewis (directed by Dawn Porter; featuring former minority leader of the Georgia House of Representatives Stacey Abrams; deceased former United States representative Elijah Cummings; United States Speaker of the House Nancy Pelosi; Reverend Raphael Warnock, former ambassador Andrew Young)
"You Built America": A Conversation on the Economy with Vice President Biden
The Biden Plan: Military Families (featuring Jill Biden)
A Tribute to Beau Biden
This Time Next Year (featuring activist Ady Barkan; Nevada senator Yvanna Cancela; Lieutenant Governor of Minnesota Peggy Flanagan; United States representative Marcia Fudge; Mayor of Long Beach, California, Robert Garcia; activist Fred Guttenberg; United States senator Kamala Harris; United States Senate candidate Jaime Harrison; Harris County, Texas, judge Lina Hidalgo; activist Dolores Huerta; activist Donna Hylton; United States senator Doug Jones; lawyer Khizr Khan; actor Daniel Dae Kim; United States senator Amy Klobuchar; author John Meacham; former United States representative Susan Molinari; former United States secretary of state Colin Powell; United States representative Beto O'Rourke; Virginia state delegate Danica Roem; lawyer James H. Roosevelt; General Francis D. Vavala; United States senator Elizabeth Warren; businessman Andrew Yang)
United We Stand (featuring former 2020 Democratic presidential candidates United States senator Cory Booker, former mayor of South Bend Pete Buttigieg, United States senator Amy Klobuchar, former United States representative Beto O'Rourke, United States senator Bernie Sanders, United States senator Elizabeth Warren, and businessman Andrew Yang)
The Biden Grandchildren
Keeping the Faith w/ The Currys (featuring Stephen Curry and his family)
Biden Introduction

Select performances
The Chicks performing "The Star-Spangled Banner"
John Legend and Common performing "Glory"

Speakers and other events
In the past, hundreds of people had addressed each convention, giving many local or statewide candidates a valuable photo op, a notable difference from this convention. Some of the speeches at this convention were pre-recorded.

The convention included performances by Leon Bridges, the Chicks, Common, Billie Eilish, Jennifer Hudson, John Legend, Billy Porter, Maggie Rogers, Prince Royce, Stephen Stills, and others.

A number of speakers at the convention included individuals who are everyday Americans, rather than officeholders or celebrities. A number of these speakers were dissatisfied Republicans, including individuals who had voted for Trump in 2016, but plan on voting for Biden in 2020.

Daytime events
Caucus meetings and other events were streamed on various platforms earlier on the days of the convention. Virtual policy roundtables were hosted in partnership with Business Forward. Many partner organization events were planned to be held, including a Protect Our Care health care panel with Nancy Pelosi, Xavier Becerra, Kathleen Sebelius, and three of the five health care activists featured in a conversation with Joe Biden on Night 2 of the convention.

Before the convention opened, an Interfaith Welcome Service was held virtually on August 16, a partner event to the DNC.

Notable speeches

Jill Biden

Jill Biden, the spouse of presidential nominee Joe Biden and the former second lady of the United States, delivered her speech on the second night of the convention from the classroom at Brandywine High School in Wilmington, Delaware, where she had been an English teacher from 1991 through 1993.

Biden's speech was focused on both family and education. She discussed how the ongoing COVID-19 pandemic had impacted education, as well as families and the economy. She touted her husband as a candidate capable of tackling the pandemic.

Biden also recounted the personal tragedies that her husband had endured, including the deaths of his first wife, Neilia, and first-born daughter, Naomi, in a 1972 automobile accident, and the 2015 death of his son Beau from brain cancer.

Joe Biden

Joe Biden, the 2020 Democratic nominee for president, delivered a speech on the fourth night of the convention from Wilmington, Delaware. A common motif emphasized throughout was the conflict between light, referring to himself, and darkness, referring to Donald Trump.

Biden began his speech by quoting Ella Baker.
Biden pledged to be a president for all Americans, regardless of whether or not they voted for him.

Biden referenced the murder of George Floyd in his speech.

While drawing a contrast between himself and Trump, Biden's speech did not include any utterances of his main opponent's name.

Michael Bloomberg

Former mayor of New York City and candidate for the 2020 Democratic nomination Michael Bloomberg delivered his speech on the final night of the convention from Colorado.

Bloomberg laid contrast between incumbent Republican president Donald Trump and Biden.

Bloomberg declared, "I'm not asking you to vote against Donald Trump because he's a bad guy. I'm urging you to vote against him because he's done a bad job."

Bloomberg likened the prospect reelecting Trump to rehiring or working for, "someone who ran your business into the ground, and who always does what's best for him or her, even when it hurts the company, and whose reckless decisions put you in danger".

Pete Buttigieg

Former mayor of South Bend, Indiana and candidate for the 2020 Democratic nomination Pete Buttigieg delivered his speech on the final night of the convention from LangLab in South Bend, Indiana, where he and his husband, Chasten, had held their wedding reception years earlier.

Buttigieg, himself openly homosexual, highlighted the progress that the United States had made on LGBT rights during his lifetime, pointing to his marriage (enabled by the 2015 Obergefell v. Hodges Supreme Court decision) and the viability of his candidacy as an openly gay candidate for the presidency as two examples of such progress. He also mentioned how, earlier in his life, when he served in the military, the "Don't ask, don't tell" policy (since repealed in 2011 under the Obama administration) had barred him from being open about his sexuality while in service.

Bill Clinton

Former president of the United States Bill Clinton delivered his speech on the second night of the convention from Chappaqua, New York.

Clinton began his speech by declaring that he believed United States presidential elections to be, "the world's most important job interview".

Clinton lambasted President Donald Trump's response to the COVID-19 pandemic.

Clinton praised Biden's work in the Obama administration on repairing the United States economy from the Great Recession. He praised Biden's plans to rebuild the United States economy from the downturn it experienced amid the COVID-19 pandemic.

He argued that Biden should be elected and that Trump should be denied a second term, declaring, "You know what Donald Trump will do with four more years: blame, bully, and belittle. And you know what Joe Biden will do: build back better."

Hillary Clinton

Former United States secretary of state and 2016 Democratic presidential nominee Hillary Clinton delivered her speech on the third night of the convention from Chappaqua, New York.

Clinton praised Biden and Harris as, "leaders equal to this moment". She praised Biden's "thoughtfulness and empathy". She praised Harris as a, "daughter of an extraordinary mother," as well as, "relentless in the pursuit of justice, and uncommonly kind."

Clinton, herself a former First Lady of the United States, expressed joy towards Jill Biden's intentions to continue her work as an educator if she becomes First Lady.

Clinton urged voters not to repeat the result of the 2016 election in which Trump had defeated her in the United States Electoral College, thus winning the presidency.

Clinton criticized Trump's presidency, saying, "Remember in 2016 when Trump asked 'What do you have to lose?' Well, now we know. Our health, our jobs, even our lives. Our leadership in the world and, yes, our post office."

Clinton stated that she believes that it is morally wrong that the richest Americans saw their wealth increase during the pandemic while tens of millions of other Americans lost.

Clinton declared, reiterating an African proverb she had helped popularize in the United States, that "it still takes a village". Her speech invoked DREAMers, and reiterated support for Black Lives Matter, while invoking the murders of George Floyd and Ahmaud Arbery, and the killing of Breonna Taylor.

Clinton invoked the struggle for voting rights in the United States. She mentioned that the previous day had marked the centennial of the ratification of the Nineteenth Amendment to the United States Constitution, which granted nationwide women's suffrage. She also invoked John Lewis' participation in the Selma to Montgomery marches fighting against racial injustice, including the disenfranchisement of black voters.

Andrew Cuomo

Governor of New York Andrew Cuomo delivered his speech on the opening night of the convention from Albany, New York.

While referencing a number of issues that plagued the nation, Cuomo's speech primarily focused on criticizing President Donald Trump's response to the COVID-19 pandemic.

Cuomo also declared that, "Only a strong body can fight off the virus, and America's divisions weakened it."

Brayden Harrington

Brayden Harrington spoke on the convention's closing night. Harrington, a 13-year-old New Hampshire boy who stutters, spoke about how, on the campaign trail during the primaries, Joe Biden had related to him about his struggles overcoming a stutter of his own, and had shared advice for how to persevere through such an impediment.

Harrington's speech attracted significant attention, being seen as one of the highlights of the convention's final night.

Kamala Harris

In her vice-presidential nomination acceptance speech on the third night of the convention, Kamala Harris declared that she and Biden will, if elected, tackle issues facing the United States, including racial injustices. Harris provided an autobiographical summary of her life and career.

John Kasich

Republican former governor of Ohio and 2000 and 2016 Republican presidential candidate John Kasich delivered remarks on the opening night of the convention in a pre-recorded video filmed at a road junction near his personal residence in Westerville, Ohio.

Kasich began his speech by declaring that, "America is at a crossroads." While calling himself a, "lifelong Republican", he declared that this came second to his sense of responsibility to the United States, which had compelled him to appear at the convention.

Building on the opening metaphor of America being at a crossroads, as well as the visual metaphor of the speech's physical location at the divergence of two paths, in his closing, Kasich declared that, "When America chooses the right path and pulls together, like we've done so many times before, we can dream big dreams and we can see the top of the mountain as a United States of America, with a soul that is a beacon of freedom to the entire world"

John Kerry

On the opening night of the convention, former United States secretary of state and 2004 Democratic presidential nominee John Kerry delivered a speech in Boston, Massachusetts, which heavily criticized Donald Trump's approach foreign policy, characterizing it as a nonstop "blooper reel".

Kerry criticized Trump for denying the existence of Russian interference in the 2016 United States elections, and for what Kerry charged was Trump's failure to protect United States troops from the alleged Russian bounty program.

Barack Obama

Former United States president Barack Obama delivered his speech on the third night of the convention from the Museum of the American Revolution in Philadelphia, Pennsylvania.

During his speech, Obama broke with the customary practice of not criticizing his presidential successor by name.

In his remarks, Obama declared, "Donald Trump hasn't grown into the job because he can't. And the consequences of that failure are severe. 170,000 Americans dead. Millions of jobs gone while those at the top take in more than ever. Our worst impulses unleashed, our proud reputation around the world badly diminished, and our democratic institutions threatened like never before."

Michelle Obama

Former first lady of the United States Michelle Obama delivered her speech on the opening night of the convention from her personal residence in Martha's Vineyard, Massachusetts.

Obama reaffirmed her conviction in the motto she expressed during her 2016 convention speech, "when they go low, we go high".

Obama declared her belief that, "being president doesn't change who you are; it reveals who you are."

Obama touted what she felt were some the successes of her husband's presidency and Joe Biden's vice presidency, including the Patient Protection and Affordable Care Act, respect for the United States from the international community, and steps made internationally to address climate change. She contrasted these with what she felt were some of the failures of the Trump presidency. She characterized the United States under Trump's leadership as, "underperforming not simply on matters of policy, but on matters of character." One failure she charged Trump with was the United States' death toll and domestic economic damage of the COVID-19 pandemic, for which she faulted Trump's downplaying of the severity of the virus. Another aspect of the Trump presidency she criticized was its reneging on international agreements and its betrayal of alliances that had been championed by past presidents, including Republicans Ronald Reagan and Dwight D. Eisenhower. She also criticized what she regarded to be Trump's emboldening of "torch-bearing white supremacists" seen at the Unite the Right rally. Obama further criticized Trump's derision of the political catchphrase and movement Black Lives Matter.

After declaring Trump an unfit president, Obama remarked, "it is what it is", echoing words that Trump had recently used about the COVID-19 death toll.

Obama directly invoked the murder of George Floyd and killing of Breonna Taylor by law enforcement earlier in 2020, which had become central flash points of ongoing protests and unrest that are considered part of the Black Lives Matter movement.

Obama touted the virtues of Biden's character, declaring him a "profoundly decent man," that, "knows what it takes to rescue an economy, beat back a pandemic, and lead our country." She recounted the personal tragedies that he had endured, including the deaths of his first wife, Neilia, and first-born daughter, Naomi, in a 1972 automobile accident, and the 2015 death of his son Beau from brain cancer, declaring that Biden's "life is a testament to getting back up, and he is going to channel that same grit and passion to pick us all up, to help us heal and guide us forward".

Obama warned of potential voter suppression in the 2020 election, and urged citizens to collectively cast their votes for Biden, "in numbers that cannot be ignored".

In the penultimate sentences of her speech, she quoted John Lewis as saying, "When you see something that is not right, you must say something. You must do something."

Nancy Pelosi

Speaker of the United States House of Representatives Nancy Pelosi delivered her speech on the third night of the convention from San Francisco, California.

Pelosi began her speech by expressing her pride in the diversity of the Democratic majority she leads in the United States House of Representatives.

In her remarks Pelosi painted President Donald Trump and Republican United States Senate majority leader Mitch McConnell as dual obstacles to progress.

Pelosi praised Biden as, "battle-tested, forward-looking, honest and authentic" and Harris as, "committed to our Constitution, brilliant in defending it".

Colin Powell

Republican former United States secretary of state Colin Powell delivered his speech on the second night of the convention from Washington, D.C.

Powell opened his speech by briefly recounting the stories of how each of his parents immigrated to the United States from Jamaica.

Powell extolled Biden for having morally strong defining values.

Powell praised the sort of leadership he argued that Biden would bring to the United States as president. He argued Biden would, "restore America's leadership in the world and restore the alliances we need to address the dangers that threaten our nation, from climate change to nuclear proliferation."

He described the United States as "a country divided", and argued that President Trump is, "doing everything in his power to keep up that way", arguing that Biden would be a unifier as president.

Bernie Sanders

United States senator from Vermont and candidate for the 2016 and 2020 
Democratic nominations Bernie Sanders spoke from Burlington, Vermont, on the opening night of the convention.

In his speech, Sanders urged his supporters to lend their support to Biden in order to oust Donald Trump. He conceded that, while he and Biden disagree on the specifics their plans to expand healthcare coverage and lower prescription drug costs, Biden still has a plan that greatly accomplish this. He also touted other issues for which Biden has plans.

Chuck Schumer

United States Senate minority leader Chuck Schumer delivered his speech on the second night of the convention from the New York City, New York, borough of Brooklyn, with the Statue of Liberty in the background.

Schumer invoked the memory of immigrants, such as his grandparents, who were greeted by the Statue of Liberty upon their arrival in the United States.

Schumer argued that America will benefit from both electing the ticket of Biden and Harris, as well as from flipping control of the United States Senate from Republican to Democratic.

Kristin Urquiza

On the opening night of the convention, Kristin Urquiza, who had lost her father Mark Urquiza to COVID-19, gave a speech, in which she said that her father, who believed Donald Trump and other Republicans that Urquiza blamed for downplaying the severity of the COVID-19 pandemic, had disregarded his safety and went to a karaoke bar with friends, where he possibly contracted the disease he succumbed to.

Urquiza criticized Trump for "dishonesty" and "irresponsible actions", which she faulted with worsening the pandemic.

Urquiza also said that one of the last things her father, who she said voted for Trump in 2016, had told her before dying was that he "felt betrayed by the likes of Donald Trump", and that she therefore planned to cast her 2020 vote for Joe Biden in honor of her father.

Urquiza's speech was regarded by pundits to be one of the highlights of the convention's opening night.

Elizabeth Warren

United States senator from Massachusetts and candidate for the 2020 Democratic nomination Elizabeth Warren delivered her speech on the third night of the convention from a classroom located in a Springfield, Massachusetts, early learning center that was temporarily closed due to the COVID-19 pandemic. Warren's speech centered on the importance of passing legislation to provide universal child care.

Gretchen Whitmer

Governor of Michigan Gretchen Whitmer delivered her speech on the opening night of the convention from UAW Local 603 in Lansing, Michigan.

Whitmer began by praising Barack Obama and Joe Biden's actions to rescue the auto industry amid its 2008–10 crisis. Whitmer then transitioned into discussing both the Michigan and national responses to the COVID-19 pandemic. She argued that Biden and Harris would provide the leadership needed to address the pandemic.

Keynote address (various speakers)

Aiming to have a "new kind of convention keynote", the Democratic Party chose to have seventeen "rising stars" co-present the convention's keynote address. The speakers were former minority leader of the Georgia House of Representatives and 2018 Georgia gubernatorial nominee Stacey Abrams (who had a solo spotlight capping the section); Tennessee state senator Raumesh Akbari; United States representative Colin Allred of Texas; United States representative Brendan Boyle of Pennsylvania; Nevada state senator Yvanna Cancela; former Ohio State representative Kathleen Clyde; Florida commissioner of agriculture Nikki Fried; Mayor of Long Beach, California, Robert Garcia; Pennsylvania state representative Malcolm Kenyatta; South Carolina state senator Marlon Kimpson; United States representative Conor Lamb of Pennsylvania, Michigan state representative Mari Manoogian; Texas state representative Victoria Neave; president of the Navajo Nation Jonathan Nez; Georgia state representative Sam Park; New Hampshire state representative Dennis Ruprecht; and mayor of Birmingham, Alabama, Randall Woodfin. This made Malcolm Kenyatta, Sam Park, and Robert Garcia the first openly gay speakers in a keynote slot at a Democratic National Convention. It also made Sam Park the first Korean-American to be part of a national party convention keynote address.

Garcia, Kenyatta, and Park became the first openly LGBTQ speakers to deliver a keynote address at a Democratic National Convention, with all three being openly-gay men.

Petula Dvorak of The Washington Post called the speech the "most realistic convention speech ever". Adam Harris of The Atlantic opined that the speech "fell flat".

Keynote speakers (in alphabetical order)

Demonstrations and protests

There were some demonstrations and protests held outside of the convention venue in Milwaukee.

Several groups scheduled protests in Milwaukee during the convention. Ryan Hamann, co-chair of the "Coalition to March on the DNC" stated that his coalition's planned protests would focus on police reform, in effect being a continuance of the nationwide George Floyd protests.

On August 2, the City of Milwaukee reported that very little interest had been indicated by parties in seeking permits to either organize a downtown parade or a speech in a downtown park.

Club Kids Inc. was scheduled to hold a permitted parade in Milwaukee at noon CDT on August 17. The Women's Human Rights Campaign was scheduled to hold a permitted parade in Milwaukee on August 20 at 10 A.M. CDT.

One day before the opening of the convention, the "DNC Delegates United for Peace" protest saw protesters, including convention delegates, protest in Milwaukee against war and military spending.

Other groups protesting in Milwaukee included Democrats for Life of America.

The Trump campaign held counter-events in Wisconsin during the convention. The campaign officially held a "Women for Trump" campaign event in Pleasant Prairie the day before the start of the convention. Additionally, the White House held multiple events in Wisconsin, which included one event in Oshkosh, Wisconsin, on the opening day of the convention, and another in Milwaukee itself the third day of the convention, with the first event featuring President Donald Trump and the latter event featuring Vice President Mike Pence. The presence of a Trump event caused the Coalition to March on the DNC to alter their plans for Monday and protest outside of the Trump event rather than outside of the convention itself.

There were protests outside of the Chase Center on the Riverfront in Wilmington, with over 100 pro-Trump demonstrators assembling a few hours prior to Biden's acceptance speech and electronic message trucks driving around the site criticizing Biden's alleged sexual assault of a former aide. The trucks were paid for Turning Point Action.

Broadcast and media coverage
The convention was slimmed down from previous iterations in terms of the length of television programming it provided, with only two hours of televised events taking place on each night of the convention. Domestic 24-hour cable news channels broadcast both hours, but Fox News and the big three domestic television networks (ABC, CBS, and NBC) only broadcast the last hour. In contrast, for past conventions, domestic 24-hour cable news channels broadcast wall-to-wall coverage of day-long proceedings. However, the length of prime time coverage provided by the "Big Three" domestic television networks was also one hour per night during the Democratic and Republican conventions of 2016.

PBS aired three hours of nightly coverage, including commentary. A number of domestic cable news channels and internet news platforms and streaming video news channels also aired significant coverage of the convention in addition to the two hours of the convention itself.

In addition to the main convention broadcast, other media coverage opportunities were made available to the press by the convention organizers and the Biden campaign, including remote press briefings and interviews.

Broadcasters pooled their resources and shrank their footprints at the convention. The convention organizers worked with both the network pool and the congressional press galleries to establish pooled media opportunities. There was more of a reliance by broadcasters on footage from press pool cameras than at past conventions. Broadcasters relied on the same shared camera feed of the convention's stage. As with past conventions, the convention organizers made a feed of convention proceedings available for free to media organizations.

Due to the pandemic, and the resultant decentralization of the convention, there was only expected to be a small press pool in Milwaukee, with as few as a hundred media personnel being anticipated to travel to Milwaukee. This was drastically less than the more than 15,000 that traveled to Philadelphia for the 2016 Democratic National Convention. Unlike past conventions, most broadcasters did not send correspondents to the convention site, and instead filmed their reporters at remote sites. Limited press were admitted into the Wisconsin Center headquarters of the convention. Those reporters that did go to the convention were socially distanced, and, at least at times, reported from outside of the convention hall. Most broadcasters had their correspondents provide coverage from network studios in New York City and Washington, D.C. In addition to filming their correspondents off-site, most broadcasters also used their primary control rooms in their headquarter cities, as opposed to the practice of establishing temporary control rooms in the convention city as many had for past conventions. Few national broadcasters sent crews to Milwaukee.

After the downsizing, but even before it was announced that Biden and other speakers would no longer travel to Milwaukee, many broadcasters had already substantially scaled back plans to send reporters to the city, or had planned to forgo sending reporters to the city altogether. By July 29, Fox News was the only broadcaster confirmed to be sending correspondents to the convention hall itself. As of early July, MSNBC had still planned a "light footprint" in the city Milwaukee, but planned to position the reporters they do send outdoors, where they can socially distance from each other, instead of inside the convention venue. CNN also, as of early August, still planned to send reporters to Milwaukee. As of early August, CBS News was planning to send two correspondents to Milwaukee. In addition, after the downsizing, but even before it was that Biden and other speakers would no longer be traveling to Milwaukee, broadcasters had already planned to significantly decrease the size of crews they would send to capture the convention in comparison to previous years. CNN had already canceled its original plans to operate a "CNN Grill" studio and meeting space, similar to those it had operated at every major party convention since 2004. They had originally planned to use Turner Hall for such a space. Fox News, on the other hand, before the announcement that Biden and other speakers would not be traveling to the convention, still planned to retain their plans to utilize the Deer Camp building in Milwaukee as a broadcast space, and CBS News still planned to rent the Milwaukee Community Sailing Center for broadcast use. NBCUniversal cancelled similar plans to use the Good City Brewing location adjacent to the Fiserv Forum.

Due to the fact that Biden and Harris spoke from Wilmington, Delaware, some media personnel covered the convention from there, with a number of broadcast vans and media tents being stationed in the parking lots of the Chase Center on the Riverfront (where Biden and Harris spoke) and adjacent Frawley Stadium.

The originally-planned full-scale convention in the Fiserv Foum would have seen broadcasters set up live sets inside the arena, as has been practice at past conventions. Before the announcement that speakers would no longer be traveling to Milwaukee, convention organizers had been setting up some form of indoor and outdoor news media spaces at the Milwaukee convention hub.

Official streams and watch parties
In addition to coverage by broadcasters, there is a stream broadcast by the DNC itself on fifteen platforms. These platforms are the convention's website, YouTube, Facebook, Twitter, Twitch, Amazon Prime Video, Microsoft Bing, Apple TV, Roku TV, Amazon Fire TV, AT&T U-verse, DirectTV, Comcast Xfinity X1, Comcast Xfinity Flex, and Amazon Alexa.

In addition, the Biden campaign scheduled numerous virtual watch parties during the convention which showed a stream of the convention, with a number of them being hosted by prominent politicians and celebrities. Some outdoor socially-distanced watch parties were hosted by Democratic Party organizations, such as one for Connecticut convention delegates to attend at Dunkin' Donuts Park in Hartford. There were additionally drive-in watch parties held by Democratic Party organizers, including one right outside the Chase Center on the Riverfront on the night Biden accepted his nomination there.

Evening television viewership 
According to Nielsen, the Democratic National Convention averaged 21.6 million views across all traditional cable and television networks across all four nights. This is composed of 19.7 million viewers on night 1, 19.2 million viewers on night 2, 22.8 million viewers on night 3, 24.6 million viewers on night 4.

These numbers do not include viewers on livestream.

Night 1 
Night one of the Democratic convention had 19.7 million viewers across all cable and television networks tracked by Nielsen. The first night of the Republican convention had 17.0 million viewers across the same networks.

Night one of the Democratic convention had 18.8 million viewers across six major, traditional television (NBC, CBS, ABC) and cable networks (FNC, CNN, MSNBC) tracked by Nielsen. The first night of the Republican convention had 15.9 million viewers across the same six networks.

The viewership for the first night of the convention was down by 25% compared to the equivalent night in 2016.

Compared to 2016, the only network that saw a rise in viewership for Night 1 was MSNBC.

Night 2
Night two of the Democratic convention had 19.2 million viewers across all television networks tracked by Nielsen. The second night of the Republican convention had 19.4 million viewers across the same networks.

Night two of the Democratic convention had 18.5 million viewers across six major, traditional television and cable networks tracked by Nielsen. The second night of the Republican convention had 18 million viewers across the same six networks. These numbers do not include viewers on streaming services.

Compared to 2016, the only network that saw a rise in viewership for Night 2 was MSNBC.

Night 3
Night three of the Democratic convention had 22.8 million viewers across all television networks tracked by Nielsen. The third night of the Republican convention had 17.3 million viewers across the same networks.

Night three of the Democratic convention had 21.5 million viewers across six major, traditional television and cable networks tracked by Nielsen.

Compared to 2016, the only network that saw a rise in viewership for Night 3 was MSNBC.

Night 4 
Night four of the Democratic convention had 24.6 million viewers across all television networks tracked by Nielsen.

Compared to 2016, the only network that saw a rise in viewership for Night 4 was MSNBC.

Compared to Night 3 of 2020, the only networks that saw a rise in viewership for Night 4 were Fox News Channel and ABC.

Impact
The convention was regarded to have been largely successful.

Lack of a convention bounce
The first polls conducted after the Democratic National Convention showed no convention bounce for Biden. Later polling, conducted after the Republican National Convention concluded the following week, indicated that there had been virtually no convention bounce for either party coming out of August conventions held in back-to-back weeks.

Ahead of, and during, the conventions, various outlets had speculated that significant convention bounces were unlikely for either party. This was due to several cited factors. One was that it had been observed that convention bounces had been more minuscule in recent elections. Per some calculations, convention bounces had averaged just 2 points since 2004, compared to just under 7 points between 1968 and 2000. Per other calculations, average bounces since 1996 averaged 3.6 points, while bounces between 1962 and 1992 averaged 6.3 points. Another factor cited for why it was seen as unlikely for either party to generate a significant convention bounce was that polls in the 2020 race had, in the months prior to the convention, shown a remarkably steady race, with Biden maintaining an average lead of 6 points, exceeding a 10-point lead in some polls and never slipping below a lead of 4 points in the polling average. It has been shown that more stable races tend to see smaller convention bounces. Another was that the conventions, having been scaled-back due to the COVID-19 pandemic, were seen as less likely to generate as much attention as past conventions had, particularly due to the decrease in television viewership . Another was that the electorate was already strongly opinionated on the candidates, with more voters holding a strong opinion on Trump than any incumbent since at least 1980, and more voters holding a strong opinion on Biden than any challenger to an incumbent since at least 1980. Races where voters hold strong opinions on the candidates tend to see smaller convention bounces. Strong partisanship among the electorate was another cited factor.

The Democrats were also seen as having factors which the Republican convention did not that might hamper its chances at a convention bump. One was the fact that the Republicans would hold their convention immediately following them. Additionally, the fact that Biden already had a large lead among independents heading into the convention possibly made Biden particularly unlikely to experience a convention bounce, as some speculated that Biden may have already been near his likely ceiling of support.

While his electoral poll numbers may not have received a bounce, some polling showed Biden to have received a boost in favorability ratings.

See also

 2020 Democratic Party presidential primaries
 2020 Republican National Convention
 2020 Libertarian National Convention
 2020 Green National Convention
 2020 Constitution Party National Convention
 2020 United States presidential election
Impact of the COVID-19 pandemic on politics

Notes

References

External links 
 Official website 
 Host Committee  
 Final Ratings for the 2020 DNC and the 2020 RNC TVNewser A.J. Katz on Aug. 28, 2020

 
2020 conferences
2020 in Wisconsin
2020 United States presidential election
2020s in Milwaukee
2020
Democratic Party of Wisconsin
Political events in Wisconsin
July 2020 events in the United States
August 2020 events in the United States
Elections postponed due to the COVID-19 pandemic
Political conventions in Wisconsin
Impact of the COVID-19 pandemic on politics
Democratic National Convention, 2020
Events affected by the COVID-19 pandemic